Achleitner is a German surname. Notable people with the surname include:

 Ann-Kristin Achleitner, German economist
 Arthur Achleitner (1858–1927), German writer
 Friedrich Achleitner (1930–2019), Austrian architect, poet, and writer
 Georg Achleitner (1806–1883), Austrian politician
 Hubert Achleitner, known as "Hubert von Goisern" (born 1952), Austrian musician
 Paul Achleitner (born 1956), Austrian economic manager

See also 
 Patricia Mayr-Achleitner (born 1986), Austrian tennis player

German-language surnames